Zingiberaceae or the ginger family is a family of flowering plants made up of about 50 genera with a total of about 1600 known species of aromatic perennial herbs with creeping horizontal or tuberous rhizomes distributed throughout tropical Africa, Asia, and the Americas. Many of the family's species are important ornamental, spice, or medicinal plants. Ornamental genera include the shell gingers (Alpinia), Siam or summer tulip (Curcuma alismatifolia), Globba, ginger lily (Hedychium), Kaempferia, torch-ginger Etlingera elatior, Renealmia, and ginger (Zingiber). Spices include ginger (Zingiber), galangal or Thai ginger (Alpinia galanga and others), melegueta pepper (Aframomum melegueta), myoga (Zingiber mioga), korarima (Aframomum corrorima), turmeric (Curcuma), and cardamom (Amomum, Elettaria).

Description

Members of the family are small to large herbaceous plants with distichous leaves with basal sheaths that overlap to form a pseudostem. The plants are either self-supporting or epiphytic. Flowers are hermaphroditic, usually strongly zygomorphic, in determinate cymose inflorescences, and subtended by conspicuous, spirally arranged bracts. The perianth is composed of two whorls, a fused tubular calyx, and a tubular corolla with one lobe larger than the other two. Flowers typically have two of their stamenoids (sterile stamens) fused to form a petaloid lip, and have only one fertile stamen. The ovary is inferior and topped by two nectaries, the stigma is funnel-shaped.

Some genera yield essential oils used in the perfume industry (Alpinia, Hedychium).

Taxonomy

Subdivisions 

Subfamily Siphonochiloideae
Tribe Siphonochileae
Siphonochilus
Subfamily Tamijioideae
Tribe Tamijieae
Tamijia
Subfamily Alpinioideae
Siliquamomum (incertae sedis)
Tribe Alpinieae
Adelmeria
Aframomum - grains of paradise
Alpinia - galangal
Amomum
Aulotandra
Cyphostigma
Elettaria - cardamom
Elettariopsis
Etlingera
Geocharis
Geostachys
Hornstedtia
Lanxangia
Leptosolena
Plagiostachys
Renealmia
Vanoverberghia
×Alpingera F. Luc-Cayol (Alpinia × Etlingera) - intergeneric hybrid
Tribe Riedelieae
Burbidgea
Pleuranthodium
Riedelia
Siamanthus
Subfamily Zingiberoideae
Caulokaempferia (incertae sedis)
Tribe Zingibereae
Boesenbergia
Camptandra
Cautleya
Cornukaempferia
Curcuma - turmeric
Curcumorpha
Distichochlamys
Haniffia
Haplochorema
Hedychium
Hitchenia
Kaempferia
Kedhalia
Laosanthus
Myxochlamys
Nanochilus
Newmania

Parakaempferia
Pommereschea
Pyrgophyllum
Rhynchanthus
Roscoea
Scaphochlamys
Smithatris
Stadiochilus
Stahlianthus
Zingiber - ginger
Tribe Globbeae
Gagnepainia
Globba
Hemiorchis

Distribution

The Zingiberaceae have a pantropical distribution in the tropics of Africa, Asia, and the Americas, with their greatest diversity in South Asia.

References

Bibliography

External links

List of Indian medicinal plants from Biodiversity of India
Abstracts from the Symposia on the Family Zingiberaceae
A New Classification of the Zingiberaceae from the Third Symposium on Zingiberaceae
Zomlefer, W.B. Flowering Plant Families. The University of North Carolina Press. 1994.

 
Commelinid families
Rhizomatous plants